Kiambu High School (KHS) is a public extra county boarding school for boys located in Kiambu County, Kenya. KHS is located in Kiamumbi Sub location, Kiambaa S/Area Location, Kiambaa Division, Kiambaa Constituency in Kiambu County.

Vision and mission statements
The school's vision to see an education centre that produces well equipped men for the society. Its mission is to provide holistic, quality, and responsive education for self development and service to society.

History
Over the years, the school has continued to registered good academic performance. The school was established in 1968 with the view to providing education to the local community. It was different from other schools in the following ways; one, while other schools were converted from intermediate schools, KHS was a secondary school from inception; two, it was free of religious affiliations and sponsorship; three, the school was designed for the open Plan system of education.

The Open Plan System of education was borrowed from Canadian compliance with the Ominde Report of 1964. This system of education was to combine education and environment and was also emphasised on skills acquisition. KHS was founded as an institution catering for environmental studies in 1976 — it had no proper curriculum. The first headmaster, Mr. John Long, was an expert in the open Plan system of education. The curriculum lasted two years and was abandoned in 1978 due to lack of requisite staff which was caused by key teachers leaving barely a year after it had started, and with that, training collapsed. Thereafter, the school shifted to offer the national curriculum like other schools.

The school is situated on a 35-acre piece of land bought in 1969 with financial support from the then Kiambu County Council. A board of Governors (BOG) was put in place with its first chairman as the late Njenga Karume who served until 1979.

The first batch of students was admitted in 1971. Since the infrastructure was incomplete, the girls were sent to Kambui Girls School and the boys to Chania High School. The buildings were constructed between 1971 and 1974 and the school opened its doors to the first residents in 1976.

It was started as a co-educational boarding school. However, due to the growing demand for boys’ school In Kiambu, it was converted to a boys’ school. Consequently, between 1990 and 1993 the girls were systematically phased out and relocated to the Mary Leakey Girls and Kijabe Girls Schools.

It is a school that builds a wholesome kind of character. It has a strong and visioned staff.  The school is a domain with men of substance, who are modeled to leave a positive mark in the society at large.

Major milestones
The following are the major milestones of Kiambu High School since inception;
 1968idea to set up a secondary for interdisciplinary curriculum based on environment
 1969first BOG (now BOM) was formed
 1971commenced construction of administration, tuition and boarding complexes
 1974completed and commissioned the buildings
 1976purchased the first school vehicle, BEDFORD. First batch of resident students (40 boys and 40 girls) admitted
 1979first "O" level examinations are done
 1991purchased new school bus, ISUZU
 1993school converted to a boys-only after the remaining girls were relocated to two neighbouring girls schools
 1994new tuition complex, "The Academic Complex" is commissioned
 1999constructed the computer laboratory and the health unit
 2003commissioned the new Administration block
 2004constructed the sports field through reclamation of the rocky field popularly known as "the valley" by the students
 2009extended the academic complex by four more classes; designated as a centre of excellence by the MOEST and MOF
 2010commenced the 200-bed capacity hostel through the ESP programme
 2011procured the 51-seater and 37-seater school buses
 2012completed and occupied the 200-bed capacity hostel
 2014drilled and equipped a new borehole; constructed and commissioned a new bakery and an ultra-modern ablution block
 2016commenced construction of Academic Complex II and the swimming pool; registered the Alumni Association
 2018commissioned the Academic Complex II; launched the Semi-Olympic Swimming Pool; and commenced construction of an additional dormitory
 2019completion and occupying of the ground floor dormitory and naming of Njuguna Kelvin kariuki as its first house captain with a capacity of 46 double decker beds with 92 students and a captains cubicle occupied by two people.

Student life 
Students are divided into eight houses, each named after famous mountains. They wear a uniform consisting of royal blue trousers, light blue shirts, maroon sweaters and royal blue ties. The school has various clubs and societies available for the students focusing on history, law and gender, debating, journalism, science, wildlife and geography.

Sports played at the school include field hockey, soccer, handball, table tennis, badminton, volleyball, rugby, swimming and basketball.

School principals

Curriculum 
The school offers a broad-based curriculum with 15 examinable subjects under 5 academic departments as follows;

Mathematics                  Mathematics

Languages                    English, Kiswahili

Science                          Biology, Physics, Chemistry

Humanities                    History, geography, CRE

Creative & Technical    Home Science, Agriculture, Power Mechanics, Electricity, Computer Studies, Business Studies

and two non-examinable subjects, Life skills Education (LSE) and Physical Education (PE).

Academic performance 
Over the years, the school has continued to registered good academic performance. The public university intake has been good over the years also. The school recognizes the great potential for academic achievement in the students and is geared towards better performance through various strategies that the school has set.

Gallery

References 

High schools and secondary schools in Kenya
Public schools in Kenya
Boys' schools in Kenya
Boarding schools in Kenya
Educational institutions established in 1971
1971 establishments in Kenya